Niversac is a railway station in Saint-Laurent-sur-Manoire, Nouvelle-Aquitaine, France. The station is located on the Coutras - Tulle and Niversac - Agen railway lines. The station is served by TER (local) services operated by SNCF.

Station History 
The station building is a brick structure with half-timbering adorning the walls. It is the sole surviving example of "an architecture desired at the time by the Compagnie du chemin de fer Paris-Orléans". The station opened in 1860 and is located at the starting point of the Périgueux – Brive and Périgueux – Agen rail lines.

Train services
The station is served by regional trains to Bordeaux, Périgueux, Brive-la-Gaillarde and Agen.

References

Railway stations in Dordogne
Railway stations in France opened in 1860